Gnathostomatidae is a family of nematodes belonging to the order Spirurida.

Genera:
 Ancyracanthus Diesing, 1839
 Cheiracanthus Diesing, 1839
 Echinocephalus Molin, 1858
 Gnathostoma Owen, 1836
 Mooleptus Özdikmen, 2010
 Spiroxys Schneider, 1866
 Tanqua Blanchard, 1904

References

Nematodes